Ratey Chu is a river in the Indian state of Sikkim that is the main source of water for the state capital, Gangtok.

References
Annual Report 2006–2007 Water Security and PHE Department. Government of Sikkim. Retrieved on 9 May 2008.

Rivers of Sikkim
Rivers of India